MUltifunctional Self protection System (MUSS, German: Multifunktionales Selbstschutz-System) is a soft kill active protection system developed to protect military vehicles against guided anti-tank missiles.

History
MUSS was developed by EADS, Buck (a Rheinmetall subsidiary) and Krauss-Maffei Wegmann (KMW). Before September 2003, it was tested on a Leopard 2 tank by the German Bundesamt für Wehrtechnik und Beschaffung.

The new German Puma infantry fighting vehicle will be equipped with MUSS, after EADS was awarded a contract in 2006.

In July 2016, the UK's Defence Science and Technology Laboratory placed a £7.6 million contract with QinetiQ to evaluate the MUSS system for armoured vehicles, particularly the Challenger 2.

Design

MUSS consists of three main elements: ultraviolet sensors, consisting of a laser warner and a missile warner which detects incoming projectile, the computer, and the electronic or pyrotechnic countermeasures (for example an infrared jamming device). When the sensors detect an incoming missile or a laser beam aimed at the vehicle, the computer activates the countermeasures. MUSS offers 360° protection with elevation up to 70° and can handle up to four threats at once.

The whole system has a weight of 65 to 160 kg.

References

External links
 Defense-Update.com "Multifunction Self Protection System"
 "Hensoldt"

Weapons countermeasures
Land active protection systems
Armoured fighting vehicle equipment
Military equipment introduced in the 2000s